Metajapyx is a genus of forcepstails in the family Japygidae. There are more than 30 described species in Metajapyx.

Species
These 37 species belong to the genus Metajapyx:

 Metajapyx aemulans (Silvestri, 1932)
 Metajapyx athenarum Cook, 1899
 Metajapyx besucheti Pages, 1978
 Metajapyx bonadonai Pagés, 1954
 Metajapyx braueri (Verhoeff, 1904)
 Metajapyx codinai (Silvestri, 1929)
 Metajapyx confectus Silvestri, 1947
 Metajapyx creticus (Cook, 1899)
 Metajapyx doderoi (Silvestri, 1934)
 Metajapyx dolinensis (Verhoeff, 1904)
 Metajapyx firmus (Silvestri, 1931)
 Metajapyx folsomi Silvestri, 1948
 Metajapyx gallicus (Silvestri, 1934)
 Metajapyx garganicus Silvestri, 1948
 Metajapyx gojkovici Pages, 1953
 Metajapyx heterocereus Muegge & Bernard, 1990
 Metajapyx illinoiensis Smith & Bolton, 1964
 Metajapyx inductus (Silvestri, 1932)
 Metajapyx insularis (Silvestri, 1907)
 Metajapyx latens (Silvestri, 1932)
 Metajapyx leruthi Silvestri, 1948
 Metajapyx magnifimbriatus Muegge & Bernard, 1990
 Metajapyx moroderi (Silvestri, 1929)
 Metajapyx multidens (Cook, 1899)
 Metajapyx parvidens Silvestri, 1948
 Metajapyx peanoi Pages, 1980
 Metajapyx pervengens (Silvestri, 1932)
 Metajapyx phitosi Pages, 1983
 Metajapyx propinquus (Silvestri, 1948)
 Metajapyx remingtoni Smith & Bolton, 1964
 Metajapyx repentinus Pages, 1953
 Metajapyx serratus (Stach, 1929)
 Metajapyx siculus (Verhoeff, 1923)
 Metajapyx steevesi Smith & Bolton, 1964
 Metajapyx strouhalae Paclt, 1957
 Metajapyx subterraneus (Packard, 1874)
 Metajapyx viti Pages, 1993

References

Diplura